Glutamate decarboxylase 2 is an enzyme that in humans is encoded by the GAD2 gene.

This gene encodes one of several forms of glutamic acid decarboxylase, identified as a major autoantigen in insulin-dependent diabetes.  The enzyme encoded is responsible for catalyzing the production of gamma-aminobutyric acid from L-glutamic acid.  A pathogenic role for this enzyme has been identified in the human pancreas since it has been identified as an autoantibody and an autoreactive T cell target in insulin-dependent diabetes.  This gene may also play a role in the stiff-person syndrome.

Interactions 

GAD2 has been shown to interact with GAD1.

See also 
 Glutamate decarboxylase

References